Milbemycin oxime, sold under the brand name Interceptor among others, is a veterinary medication from the group of milbemycins, used as a broad spectrum antiparasitic. It is active against worms (anthelmintic) and mites (miticide).

Mechanism of action
Milbemycins are products of fermentation by Streptomyces species. They have a similar mechanism of action, but a longer half-life than the avermectins. Milbemycin oxime is produced by Streptomyces hygroscopicus aureolacrimosus. It opens glutamate sensitive chloride channels in neurons and myocytes of invertebrates, leading to hyperpolarisation of these cells and blocking of signal transfer.

Uses
Milbemycin oxime is active against a broad spectrum of nematodes. Its miticide spectrum includes Sarcoptes and Demodex. The drug is FDA-approved for prevention of heartworm in dogs and cats, although it is less potent against heartworms than ivermectin.

The substance is often combined with other parasiticides to achieve a broader spectrum of action. Such products include:
 Milbemax and Interceptor Plus (with praziquantel)
 Sentinel Flavor Tabs (with lufenuron)
 Trifexis (with spinosad)
 NexGard Spectra (with afoxolaner)

The drug has been used in marine reef aquaria to control parasitic Tegastidae copepod infestations on captive hard coral colonies. Other arthropod invertebrates will be killed by the treatment.

Side effects
The drug is usually tolerated well, but such side effects may occur such as vomiting, phlegming, and glassy eyes.

References

Anthelmintics
Insecticides
Veterinary drugs
Spiro compounds